Michael Tierney may refer to:

Michael Tierney (bishop) (1839–1908), Roman Catholic bishop
Michael Tierney (politician) (1894–1975), Irish politician, president of University College Dublin
Michael Tierney (musician) (born 1977), member of Australian band Human Nature
Michael Tierney (Gaelic footballer) (born 1986), Gaelic football player from Laois in Ireland
Mick Pyro, Irish musician